1st Airborne may refer to:
 1st Airborne Division (United Kingdom)
 1st Airborne Task Force (United States)
 1st Airmobile Division (Ukraine)
 1st Airborne Corps (Soviet Union)
 1st Airborne Brigade (Japan)
 1st Airborne Brigade (Soviet Union)
 1st Airborne Brigade, part of the 1st Air Cavalry Division of the U.S. Army during the Vietnam War
 1st Polish Parachute Brigade